Janwar, is a 1965 Hindi film directed by Bhappi Sonie. It stars Shammi Kapoor, Rajshree in lead roles. The music is composed by Shankar-Jaikishan and lyrics are by Hasrat Jaipuri, Shailendra and Faiz Ahmad Faiz.

It is notable for a rendition of the song "Dekho Ab To Kisi Ko Nahin Hai Khabar", set to the tune of the Beatles song "I Wanna Hold Your Hand".

Plot 
Mr. Srivastava lives a very wealthy lifestyle with his wife and two sons, Mahendra and Sunder. He plans to get his sons married to women from equally wealthy backgrounds. Mahendra falls in love with Seema, who is poor and lives with her stepmother. This creates considerable acrimony in the family, and Seema is not accepted as a daughter-in-law. Unable to find a solution, Mahendra takes to alcohol and falls in the bewitching clutches of a beautiful courtesan named Bahaar.

While vacationing in Srinagar, Sunder meets Sapna, who also comes from a poor family, falls in love with her and wants to marry her. She, too, falls in love with him. After the vacation, the two part company. The next time Sapna sees Sunder, he in the company of a pregnant woman and overhears that he is soon to be a father. Did Sunder decide to obey his father's instructions after all? If so, what is to become of Sapna?

Cast
 Prithviraj Kapoor as Mr. Shrivastav
 Shammi Kapoor as Sundar Shrivastav
 Rajshree as Sapna
 Rehman as Mahendra Shrivastav
 Shyama as Seema Shrivastav
 Achala Sachdev as Mrs. Shrivastav
 Rajendranath as Chintu
 Asit Sen as Gyan Prasad
 Manorama as Seema's Stepmother
 Krishan Dhawan as Servant
 Manmohan as Traffic Police

Soundtrack
The music was composed by Shankar–Jaikishan and the songs were written by lyricists Hasrat Jaipuri, Shailendra and Faiz Ahmad Faiz.

References

External links 
 

1960s Hindi-language films
1965 films
Films scored by Shankar–Jaikishan
Films directed by Bhappi Sonie
Faiz Ahmad Faiz